Joseph Daniel Sherman (September 25, 1926 – March 17, 2017) was an American songwriter, conductor, arranger, publisher and producer.

Career
Sherman was born in Brooklyn, New York, United States.

Joe Sherman's chief collaborators included his brother, Noel, as well as George David Weiss, Sid Wayne, Langston Hughes, and Abby Mann.  With his brother as lyricist, he composed "To the Ends of the Earth and "Eso Beso" for Paul Anka and "Juke Box Baby" for Perry Como. The brothers joint composition, "Ramblin' Rose", was a hit for Nat King Cole among others.

His brother, Noel, died in 1972. Joe Sherman died on March 17, 2017.

References

Bibliography 

 "Among the standards that Sherman composed are "Ramblin' Rose," "Graduation Day," "Eso Beso" and "To the Ends of the Earth".

 "Joe had already built an outstanding reputation as a songwriter, having written such hits as "Ramblin' Rose" and "That Sunday, That Summer" for Nat "King" Cole, "Eso Beso" for Paul Anka, and others like "To the Ends of the Earth" and "Graduation Day".

External links

1926 births
2017 deaths
Songwriters from New York (state)